Alexander Burns is an American journalist. He is a national political correspondent for The New York Times and a political analyst at CNN.

Education
Burns earned a Bachelor of Arts degree from Harvard College in 2008. He began his career editing the Harvard Political Review and also wrote for a history-themed blog sponsored by American Heritage.

Career 
Burns joined the staff of Politico in 2008. He moved to The New York Times in 2015 to cover politics for the Metro desk, before being appointed political correspondent in time for the 2016 presidential election. Burns has also appeared as a guest on Morning Joe.

Together with fellow New York Times reporter Jonathan Martin, Burns authored the book This Will Not Pass: Trump, Biden, and the Battle for America’s Future on the last months of Donald Trump's presidency, the COVID-19 pandemic, and the January 6, 2021 attack on the US Capitol building, which was published in May 2022.

Personal life 
He is married to CNN correspondent MJ Lee, whom he met while working at Politico.

Works 

 Jonathan Martin & Alexander Burns, This Will Not Pass: Trump, Biden, and the Battle for America's Future. Simon & Schuster, 2022

References

External links

Collected articles at The New York Times
 

Living people
Year of birth missing (living people)
Date of birth missing (living people)
21st-century American journalists
American newspaper journalists
American television reporters and correspondents
American male journalists
The New York Times people
Harvard College alumni